James Thomas S. Devlin (10 April 1903 – after 1935) was a Scottish professional footballer who made 17 appearances in the Football League playing for Birmingham, Preston North End, Swindon Town, Walsall and Oldham Athletic. He played as an inside forward.

Career
Devlin was born in Bellshill, North Lanarkshire. He began his football career with junior clubs before moving into the Scottish League, first with Third Lanark and then King's Park. He came to England to sign for Birmingham of the First Division in September 1924. Devlin played only twice for Birmingham, unable to dislodge Johnny Crosbie from the inside-right position, and in January 1926 joined Preston North End for a fee of £362. After only a few first-team games, Devlin was sold on to Liverpool for £250, at the same time as his brother William joined from Huddersfield. Unlike his brother, Tom Devlin failed to appear for Liverpool's first team, and moved on to Swindon Town 12 months later.

Then followed appearances for clubs in several countries, including Brooklyn Wanderers and Fall River in the United States, FC Zürich in Switzerland, and RC Roubaix in France, interspersed with a return to Scotland with Aberdeen, though again without appearing for the first team, and several more English clubs, including further appearances in the Football League with Walsall and Oldham Athletic. He retired from the game in about 1936, and died in his native Scotland.

Notes

References

1903 births
Year of death missing
Footballers from Bellshill
Scottish footballers
Association football inside forwards
Shawfield F.C. players
Kilsyth Rangers F.C. players
Third Lanark A.C. players
King's Park F.C. players
Birmingham City F.C. players
Preston North End F.C. players
Liverpool F.C. players
Swindon Town F.C. players
Brooklyn Wanderers players
Aberdeen F.C. players
Walsall F.C. players
Fall River F.C. players
FC Zürich players
Fleetwood Town F.C. players
Oldham Athletic A.F.C. players
RC Roubaix players
Scottish Junior Football Association players
Scottish Football League players
English Football League players
American Soccer League (1921–1933) players
Ligue 2 players
Scottish expatriate sportspeople in France
Expatriate footballers in France
Scottish expatriate sportspeople in Switzerland
Expatriate footballers in Switzerland
Scottish expatriate sportspeople in the United States
Expatriate soccer players in the United States
Scottish expatriate footballers